Don Kramer is an American comics artist. He has worked for both Marvel and DC, as well as on independent projects. Titles at DC include a Doctor Fate miniseries with Chris Golden, JSA with Geoff Johns and a run on Detective Comics with Paul Dini. He was also the artist for Nightwing with Peter Tomasi, the JSA vs Kobra mini-series with Eric Trautmann and J. Michael Straczynski's run on Wonder Woman.

Kramer was born in Seoul, South Korea, raised in Chebanse, Illinois, and is a graduate of Illinois Wesleyan University in Bloomington, Illinois.

References

External links

Creator listing at DC Comics website

American comics artists
Living people
1969 births
People from Kankakee County, Illinois
Illinois Wesleyan University alumni
Artists from Illinois
American people of South Korean descent